The white-lipped tree frog is the world's largest tree frog.

White-lipped tree frog may also refer to:

 Asian white-lipped tree frog, a frog found in Asia
 Wandolleck's white-lipped tree frog, a frog endemic to Papua New Guinea

Animal common name disambiguation pages